Judit Rumy de Rum et Rábadoroszló (11 January 1606 – 1663) was a Hungarian noblewoman, wife of Dániel Esterházy, the founder of the Csesznek branch of the House of Esterházy. She was the lady of Gáta (today: Gattendorf, Austria). Later, her property belonged to the Esterházy family.

Family
Her grandfather was Vice-ispán of Vas County Ferenc Rumy. Baron Dániel and she married on 20 February 1623. They had several children:

 Zsófia (16 March 1624 – 26 March 1624), died as an infant
 János (27 January 1625 – 22 June 1692), created Count in 1683
 Tamás (20 December 1625 – 26 August 1652), killed in the Battle of Vezekény
 Zsigmond (30 December 1626 – 1692)
 Gáspár (13 January 1628 – 26 August 1652), killed in the Battle of Vezekény
 Mihály (28 February 1629 – 27 July 1686), killed in the Battle of Buda
 György (25 March 1630 – 9 August 1663), Titular Bishop of Szendrő, killed in the Battle of Párkány
 Ádám (1631 – 12 August 1638), died young
 Mária Magdolna (19 February 1633 – 1672), married to Count András Serényi de Kisserény (d. 1689) in 1672
 Anna (11 March 1634 – 22 November 1635), died young
 Krisztina (1 August 1635 – 31 December 1640), died young
 Gábor (5 September 1637 – 8 September 1637), died as an infant (twin)
 András (5 September 1637 – September 1643), died young (twin)
 Imre (15 September 1638 – 1670)
 István (19 January 1640 – 4 February 1643), died young
 János (2 February 1643 – 4 February 1643), died as an infant

References

1606 births
1663 deaths
Hungarian nobility